The ATS 56 G is a Soviet artillery tractor used mainly for towing 152 mm howitzers and as an ammo transporter. It was used during the war in Vietnam.

Artillery tractors